Mark Angelo David Vinzon (born September 20, 1953), professionally known as Roi Vinzon, is a Filipino action star, film and television actor and film director. He is best known for his role of Retired General Armando Soriano in the controversial drama My Husband's Lover. His latest films was an indie film Ang Babae sa Sementeryo and Baklas: Human Organs for Sale.

Political career
In 2013, Vinzon ran for a seat as board member of Third District of Pampanga, but lost.

Filmography

Television

Film
Meant to Beh (2017)
Barbi: D' Wonder Beki (2017) 
Muslim Magnum .357: To Serve and Protect (2014)
Overtime (2014)
Boy Golden: Shoot to Kill, the Arturo Porcuna Story (2013)
My Little Bossings (2013) (Special Participation)
Raketeros (2013)
The Fighting Chefs (2013)
Daniel Rapido (2013)
El Presidente (2012)
Shake, Rattle and Roll Fourteen: The Invasion (2012)
Tiktik: The Aswang Chronicles (2012)
Manila Kingpin: The Asiong Salonga Story (2011)
Ang Babae sa Sementeryo (2010)
Baklas: Human Organs for Sale (2009)  
Anak ng Kumander (2008)
Resiklo (2007)
Batas Militar (2006)
Apoy sa Dibdib ng Samar (2006)
Bertud ng Putik (2003)
Lapu-Lapu (2002) - Datu Zula
Walang Iba Kundi Ikaw (2002)
Kilabot at Kembot (2002)
Batas ng Lansangan (2002)
Dugong Aso: Mabuting Kaibigan, Masamang Kaaway (2001)
Hostage (2001)
Hindi Sisiw ang Kalaban Mo (2001)
Sgt. Isaias Marcos: Bawat Hakbang Panganib (2000)
Palaban (2000)
Antonio Cuervo - Police: Walang Pinipili ang Batas (2000)
Bayadra Brothers (1999)
Largado (1999)
Pintado (1999)
Anino (1999)
Wala Ka Nang Lupang Tatapakan (1999)
Jesus Salonga Alyas Boy Indian (1998)
Sino si Inday Lucing (1997)
SIG. 357 Baril Mo ang Papatay sa Yo (1997)
Tapusin Natin Ang Laban (1997)
Mahirap Patayin, Masamang Buhayin (1996)
Mortal Kong Kaaway, Kaibigan Kong Tunay (1996)
Adan Lazaro (1996)
Totoy ng Bangkusay (1996)
Kapitan Tumba: The Capt. Jose Huevos Story (1995)
Ismael Zacarias (1994)
Mistah (1994)
Baby Paterno: Dugong Pulis (1994)
Lucas Abelardo (1994)
Oo Na, Sige Na (1993)
Tumbasan Mo ng Buhay (1993)
Dalawa Laban sa Mundo ang Siga at ang Beauty (1993)
Pretty Boy (1993)
Paranaque Bank Robbery: The Joselito Joseco Story (1993)
Rodel Sta. Cruz: Halang ang Bituka (1993)
Kahit Ako'y Busabos (1993)
Pacifico Guevarra Dillinger ng Dose Pares (1992)
Hanggang May Buhay (1992)
Cordora: Lulutang Ka sa Sarili Mong Dugo (1992)
Mahirap Maging Pogi (1992)
Mandurugas (1992)
Magnong Rehas (1992) - Dado
Dilinger (1992) - Totoy Tari
Grease Gun Gang (1992) - Julio
Kahit Buhay Ko (1992)
Dudurugin Kita ng Bala Ko (1992) (Director: Toto Natividad)
Jesus Dela Cruz: Mga Batang Riles (1992)
Angelito San Miguel: Mga Batang City Jail (1991)
Noel Juico: Batang Kriminal (1991)
Boyong Mañalac: Hoodlum Terminator (1991)
Ang Utol Kong Hoodlum (1991)
Jabidah Massacre (1990)
Kakampi Ko ang Diyos (1990)
Sgt. Melgar (1989)
Sa Diyos Lang Ako Susuko (1989) - Arguelio
Sunugin si Antero Castro (1989)
Imortal (1989)
Urban Terrorist (1988)
Lost and Found Command: Rebels Without Because (1987)
James Bone Agent 007 (1987)
Bukas Uulan ng Bala (1986)
Da Payting Ninja (1986)
American Ninja (1986)
The Moises Padilla Story (1985)
Grease Gun Brothers (1985)
Schoolgirls (1982) - Roi
Hatulan si Jun Bastardo (1980)
Jaguar (1979)

Awards

References

External links

1953 births
Living people
Filipino film directors
Filipino male comedians
Kapampangan people
Male actors from Manila
People from Angeles City
Filipino male film actors
Filipino male television actors
GMA Network personalities
ABS-CBN personalities
Filipino actor-politicians
Independent politicians in the Philippines